X Games Snocross is a snocross racing video game from ESPN and 2XL Games that was released on January 18, 2010, for iOS. It was the first game demoed on the Apple iPad on stage January 27, 2010 by Scott Forstall.

Gameplay
The game has six tracks to race on and allows players to design their own rider; X Games competitors Levi LaVallee and Heath Frisby also appear in the game. In single-player, the game features an Arcade and Career mode, along with Wi-Fi and Bluetooth multiplayer capabilities. Accelerating the snowmobile is assigned to a button on the right side of the screen, while tilting does the steering. While in the air, buttons on both sides will then make tricks, and the player can tilt for a flip.

References

2010 video games
IOS games
Racing video games
Video games developed in the United States